The Manor may refer to:

Places

Australia
 The Manor, Mosman, a large 1911 house in the Sydney suburb of Mosman

England
 The Manor (Cambridgeshire), a house built in the 1130s
 The Manor Studio, a recording studio in Shipton-on-Cherwell, Oxfordshire
Manor Ground (Oxford), former home ground of Oxford United F.C., known colloquially as The Manor

United States
 The Manor (Los Angeles), constructed in 1988; the largest home in Los Angeles County
 The Manor (Bishopville, South Carolina), Tisdale House, a historic home built between 1914 and 1918
 The Manor (West Virginia), Peter and Jesse Hutton Farm, a historic home located near Petersburg built about 1830
The Manor (Glen Cove, New York), constructed in 1910

Media
 The Manor (film), a 2021 horror film
 The Manor (novel), a 1967 novel by Isaac Bashevis Singer
 The Manor, a place central to the anime series Noir

See also
 Manor (disambiguation)
 Manse